The Timiskaming Graben is a  long and  wide depression straddling the Ontario–Quebec border in Eastern Canada. It is a northwesterly extension of the Ottawa-Bonnechere Graben, a failed arm of the Saint Lawrence rift system which is related to the opening of the Iapetus Ocean.

Formation of the Timiskaming Graben corresponded with collapse of the regional crust along the Quinze Dam and Cross Lake faults possibly as early as 2.4 billion years ago. It was then reactivated during periods of crustal extension related to the breakups of supercontinents Rodinia and Pangaea and during compression related to the various orogenies that formed the Appalachian Mountains.

The Timiskaming Graben is a seismically active structure in the Western Quebec Seismic Zone. Reactivation of faults has resulted in earthquakes, such as the 1935 Timiskaming earthquake.

References

Aulacogens
Geology of Ontario
Geology of Quebec
Seismic faults of Canada
Structural geology
Natural history of Ontario
Natural history of Quebec
Valleys of Ontario
Valleys of Quebec
Landforms of Nipissing District
Landforms of Timiskaming District
Landforms of Abitibi-Témiscamingue